Middleton St George is a large village and civil parish in the borough of Darlington and the ceremonial county of County Durham, England. According to the 2011 UK Census the population was 3,779, including Middleton One Row, Low Middleton and Oak Tree. 
It has grown rapidly since the mid-1990s, becoming a commuter area for Darlington. The population of the Darlington ward in question again taken at the 2011 Census was 4,650.

History 
 
In 1870-72 John Marius Wilson's Imperial Gazetteer of England and Wales described Middleton St. George.

Governance 
Middleton St George within the Sedgefield parliamentary constituency  which is under the control of the Conservative Party. The current Member of Parliament, since the 2019 general election, is Paul Howell. 

The village falls under the Sadberge and Middleton St. George ward of Darlington Borough Council, the parish council holds monthly meetings in the local community centre.

Transport
The original line of the Stockton and Darlington Railway passed through the village, which is now served by Dinsdale railway station, within a mile of the village is Teesside International Airport, formerly RAF Middleton St. George.

Middleton St George is also served by the an hourly bus service provided by Arriva North East, which links the airport to Darlington and Hurworth Place.

Education 
The village primary school, St George's Church of England Academy has approximately 400 pupils aged 3 to 11, in 2019 it was among the top 3 percent of primary schools nationally for student progress.

Religion 
The nearest church to the village is the Church of England St. George's in Low Middleton, however due to a lack of facilities, the building does not hold regular Sunday services, those instead being held at the village school, the premises still functions for weddings, baptisms, funerals and Christmas & Easter services. 

Another Church of England property, St Laurence's in adjoining Middleton One Row dated back to 1871, and was officially closed in 2012 after structural difficulties and high repair costs, it has now been converted into a luxury home.

Community and culture 
The local community centre was formerly a pumping station dating back to 1930, having been sold to the parish council in 1980.

The village amenities include Londis and Premier convenience stores, independently owned takeaways, a pet supply shop, a veterinarian practice and a local public house, The Havelock Arms.

There are also healthcare services in the form of St. George's Medical Practice and a dental surgery.

Sport 
The local football team, Middleton Rangers FC, play in the Stockton Sunday League Division 1, an affiliate league of the North Yorkshire County Football Association. The village cricket club, Middleton St George CC, play in the Darlington and District Cricket League Division A. The nearby Dinsdale Golf Club has a history dating back to 1910.

References

External links

Villages in County Durham
Places in the Borough of Darlington
Places in the Tees Valley